Upía River, a river in Colombia originating at Lake Tota (5°29'31" N, 72°56'04" W), is a tributary of the Meta River flowing into the Orinoco River basin.

See also
List of rivers of Colombia

References
Rand McNally, The New International Atlas, 1993.

Rivers of Colombia